Belgium was represented by Jacques Raymond, with the song "Waarom?", at the 1963 Eurovision Song Contest, which took place on 23 March in London. The song was chosen in the national final on 16 February. Raymond had previously finished second in the Belgian final in 1961, and would later represent the country in a duet with Lily Castel in 1971.

Before Eurovision

National final
The final was held on 16 February at the Amerikaans Theater in Brussels, hosted by Denise Maes and Bob Boon. Six songs qualified for the final having survived a series of qualifying rounds, the details of which are also unknown. The winner was chosen by an expert jury and a public jury. The points were allocated through a decibel meter which measured how loud the applause was for each song, and the amount was counted into points. However, because it only calculated noise, boos were also counted as points. Among the other participants was future Belgian representative Lize Marke (1965).

At Eurovision 
On the night of the final Raymond performed 14th in the running order, following Sweden and preceding Monaco. Voting was by each national jury awarding 5-4-3-2-1 to their top 5 songs, and at the close of the voting "Waarom?" had received 4 points (all from Austria), placing Belgium 10th of the 16 competing entries. The Belgian jury awarded its 5 points to contest winners Denmark.

Voting

References 

1963
Countries in the Eurovision Song Contest 1963
Eurovision